The Brotherhood of Mutants (originally known as the Brotherhood of Evil Mutants, sometimes referred to as the BoEM or B.O.E.M) is a fictional team appearing in American comic books published by Marvel Comics. The characters are depicted as being devoted to mutant superiority over normal humans. They are among the chief adversaries of the X-Men.

The group's roster and ideology have varied from incarnation to incarnation, ranging from world domination to serving as a terrorist group that targets anti-mutant public figures. They are almost always at odds with the more peaceful X-Men, though on rare occasions the two sides have allied against a common threat, most notably Apocalypse.

The original Brotherhood was depicted as Magneto's primary allies in his early battles with the X-Men in comics published in the 1960s. The original Brotherhood was ultimately disbanded, with Quicksilver and Scarlet Witch going on to become members of the Avengers. In 1981, the Brotherhood of Mutants was revived under the leadership of Mystique while the group's most visible incarnation during the early 1990s was led by Toad.

The Brotherhood of Mutants has also appeared in several animated series featuring the X-Men and has been Magneto’s group in the recent X-Men film series.

Publication history

The original Brotherhood of Evil Mutants was created by writer Stan Lee and artist/co-writer Jack Kirby and first appeared in X-Men #4 (March 1964).

Ideology 
While later incarnations of the Brotherhood promoted the group's existence as a political and ideological rival to Professor Charles Xavier's dream of peace with humans, the group was originally conceived as simply a small, but powerful army of minions gathered by Magneto to aid in his schemes for world domination. But since the group's second incarnation, the group has become a much more politically motivated group designed for use of violence to provide justice and lead the so-called 'mutant revolution' against mankind.

One of the greater ironies of the group has been its use of "Evil" in its name. When his decision to name the group was brought up in an interview, Stan Lee simply said, "We were kind of corny in those days." Since the early 1990s, writers have attempted to explain this away by having Toad describe it as irony, based upon the perceived notion that all mutants are "evil." Later writers have opted instead to simply drop "Evil" from the group's name and refer to the group as "The Brotherhood of Mutants" or simply the Brotherhood. In Earth-X, Uatu explained that Magneto chose it so that, as the opposing side, Charles would be forced to assume the role of "Good," and that Magneto believed that by locking Charles into absolutes of morality, he could manipulate him.

Many of the group's members have been shown to be past victims of anti-mutant prejudice, which has made the group a haven for many mutants who feel they are outcasts and pariahs. While many of these outcast mutants have willingly embraced the violent aspects of the Brotherhood's ideology, several have ultimately rejected it and left the group because of it. Most notably, Quicksilver and the Scarlet Witch left the group due to their disdain for Magneto's various schemes for world domination to join the Avengers, a group of heroes dedicated to help save the world as opposed to ruling it.

Fictional team history

Magneto's Brotherhood
The original leader of the team was Magneto, a mutant with the ability to control magnetic fields. It would later be revealed that Magneto was a Holocaust survivor, explaining his distrust of humanity and its inability to accept those who are different. The other members of the original team were Quicksilver, who can move and think at incredible speeds, his twin sister, the Scarlet Witch, who has the power to affect probability fields, the Toad, a sniveling villain with incredible jumping ability and a medieval costume, and Mastermind, with the power to create illusions of sight, smell, taste, touch and sound. Quicksilver and Scarlet Witch had joined after Magneto saved Wanda from a mob who believed she was a witch after she accidentally made a house burst into flame. She joined to repay the debt, and Pietro joined to keep her safe. Time and again, the Brotherhood clashed with the original X-Men team (consisting of Cyclops, Angel, Beast, Iceman and Marvel Girl), in their first appearance taking control of a small country with the aid of Mastermind creating an illusion of an army. They captured the Angel and took him to Asteroid M, but he was rescued. They tried to recruit the Sub-Mariner, and then the Blob, but the X-Men succeeded against them. Finally Magneto and Toad were captured by an extraterrestrial being called the Stranger, who they at first believed was a powerful mutant, but he revealed himself to be an alien. Mastermind had been turned to a block of solid matter by the Stranger, Quicksilver and the Scarlet Witch left the team and later joined the Avengers. Later, back on Earth, Magneto reorganized the team three times, including such mutants as the Blob and Unus the Untouchable, as well as the Savage Land mutate Lorelei, and creating a team that was later alternately called Mutant Force and the Resistants. Following a battle with the Defenders, the members of the Brotherhood were all transformed into infants by Alpha. The babies were brought to Muir Island, where they were placed under the care of Moira MacTaggert. Magneto was later restored to adulthood by Erik the Red, and quickly escaped MacTaggert's research facility. During this incident, the other members of the Brotherhood also regained their adult forms, but discovered that Magneto had abandoned them. Without their leader, the Brotherhood soon teamed up with the Vanisher as part of a plot to get revenge on the X-Men, but were beaten by the Champions. After this defeat, the Brotherhood was disbanded, and its remaining members were imprisoned.

Mystique's Brotherhood
The shapeshifting mutant Mystique later organized her own Brotherhood of Evil Mutants. Members included Pyro, the Blob, Avalanche, Destiny and Rogue. This team (minus Rogue, who had defected to the X-Men) later became the core membership of the government-sponsored team called Freedom Force. As Freedom Force, their membership briefly included Spiral and the second Spider-Woman, and later included Super Sabre, the Crimson Commando, and Stonewall. This group both fought and teamed up with several heroic groups, including the Avengers, but ultimately disbanded after Destiny, Super Sabre and Stonewall were killed in action, Mystique faked her death, the Crimson Commando was crippled and the Blob and Pyro were abandoned on a mission in Iraq.

Toad's Brotherhood
The Toad also organized a Brotherhood of Evil Mutants of his own at one point, including the Blob and Pyro, a woman named Phantazia who could disrupt electronics and superhuman powers, and the vampiric humanoid pterosaur called Sauron, who is not an actual mutant. Toad's Brotherhood was concerned mostly with hatching revenge schemes against the X-teams, but was repeatedly defeated by X-Force, X-Factor, Darkhawk, Spider-Man and the Sleepwalker.

Havok's Brotherhood
Havok, after being captured and subjected to intensive brainwashing by the Dark Beast, formed his own short-lived Brotherhood of Mutants whose membership included himself, the Dark Beast, Fatale, and, briefly, Aurora, Random, Ever and X-Man. Despite Jean Grey's proclamation that Havok was acting of his own free will as well as the plot point of Dark Beast brainwashing Havok, it was ultimately revealed that Havok formed the team as part of a sting operation designed to find out the illegal experiments the Dark Beast was performing and fell apart when Havok and the Dark Beast finally clashed. This incarnation was the first Brotherhood to omit the "Evil" from its name.

Professor X's Brotherhood
The following incarnation included new members the Mimic and Post as well as the Blob and Toad. They freed Charles Xavier from prison and helped the X-Men against the animated Cerebro, who had created a team of fake X-Men. They later cooperated with Mystique in an attempt to capture the Machine Man. The team disbanded shortly afterwards.

During this time period, it was revealed that the teleporter named Astra had been a member of the original Brotherhood, providing Magneto with the technology used to create Asteroid M and locating potential recruits, including Nightcrawler. Though she was in love with Magneto, he did not love her. This rejection led to her quitting the team and served as the motivation behind her creation of the Magneto clone Joseph.

Mystique's Second Brotherhood
During the threat of the Legacy Virus, Mystique organized another Brotherhood, drawing members from nearly every incarnation, and adding Sabretooth and Martinique Jason to the lineup. A training session also showed a new Super Sabre and Commando, but they were not included on the mission. This Brotherhood attempted to kill senator Robert Kelly (thwarted by Cable, Gambit, Beast, Colossus and Pyro), but managed to assassinate Moira MacTaggert before they were disbanded.

The Brotherhood
Later, a short-lived Marvel series called The Brotherhood featured a large group of mutant terrorists, unrelated to any other version of the Brotherhood. The group was founded by the mutants Hoffman, Orwell and Marshal, but Marshal left the group and became a government agent. Hoffman hid his identity under the alias "X". Marshal had the orders to take down the Brotherhood, but was really planning on killing Hoffman and becoming the new "X". This series was cancelled after nine issues, at which point all members had either been killed in the power struggle between Hoffman and Marshal or by the publicity-driven X-Force (later renamed X-Statix).

Mystique's Third Brotherhood
The next incarnation of the Brotherhood was led by Mystique again and included the new member Fever Pitch. This Brotherhood had infiltrated the X-Corps and took over the group, before it was defeated by the X-Men and Mystique sucked into another dimension by X-Corps recruit Abyss (ironically landing the two into the arms of Azazel, who was the father of both Abyss and Mystique's biological son Nightcrawler). Following her being rescued from her former lover's realm, Mystique would become a reluctant agent of Professor X, doing black ops missions for him. While employed, Mystique claimed that the second and third Brotherhood formed by her were actually formed by someone trying to frame her, something Xavier dismissed as lies designed by Mystique to gain sympathy from Xavier.

Xorn's Brotherhood
Another Brotherhood was formed by former X-Man Xorn, who thought he was Magneto. His Brotherhood were his former students Beak, Angel Salvadore, Martha Johansson, Basilisk II, Ernst, Esme and old Brotherhood member Toad. Most members rebelled against Xorn after he accidentally killed Basilisk and his insanity became too obvious to ignore.

Exodus' Brotherhood
In the "Heroes and Villains" arc that concluded Chuck Austen's run on X-Men, a new version of the Brotherhood appeared. The team was led by the powerful mutant Exodus, who had once been Magneto's herald, and its other members included Avalanche, Sabretooth (who had simply been hired by Exodus), and new members Black Tom Cassidy, Mammomax, Nocturne (who was revealed to be spying on the team), and Juggernaut (who was later revealed to be a mole). After Black Tom killed Juggernaut's friend Sammy Paré the "Fish-Boy" (who was attacking Juggernaut for his "apparent betrayal"), Juggernaut lashes out and tried to destroy the Brotherhood. After knocking Juggernaut and several other Brotherhood members unconscious, Exodus led his team to the Xavier Institute to claim revenge for the apparent death of Magneto. The entire team was defeated by the second Xorn, who sucked them into the "black hole" within his head; Nocturne was sucked in as well, and Juggernaut followed her. They eventually landed in Mojoworld, where the others sold Nocturne and Juggernaut to Mojo, for their freedom.

Sunspot's Brotherhood
In Young X-Men, Donald Pierce, in disguise as Cyclops, deceives several X-Men in training into attacking what he dubs a new incarnation of the Brotherhood, which consists of Cannonball, Danielle Moonstar and Magma, all under the leadership of Sunspot, Lord Imperial of the Hellfire Club. However, this was just a manipulative ruse, and these four New Mutants were neither a team at the time nor conducting villainous activity.

Red Queen's Sisterhood
An all-female incarnation called the Sisterhood was formed by the "Red Queen"—revealed to be Madelyne Pryor—who recruited Martinique Jason, Lady Mastermind, Chimera, and the non-mutants Spiral and Lady Deathstrike. The Sisterhood was able to capture and brainwash the former X-Man Psylocke, making her a member also. Although being neither female nor a recruited member, former Hellions member Empath was revealed to be helping the team in their attack against the X-Men. The Red Queen is later lured into a trap set by Cyclops (Madelyne's former husband) and defeated. Psylocke broke free from her brainwashing and rejoined the X-Men. The other Sisterhood members all escape.

Joseph's Brotherhood
In the miniseries "Magneto: Not a Hero", Joseph is resurrected under unknown circumstances and forms a new Brotherhood of Mutants with Astra and mutated deformed versions of Blob, Mastermind, Quicksilver, Scarlet Witch, and Toad. It is soon revealed that the mutated versions of Blob, Mastermind, Quicksilver, Scarlet Witch, and Toad are clones created by Astra. All the clones were killed by Magneto. Joseph is defeated by Magneto and remanded to Utopia's X-Brig.

Daken's Brotherhood
In Uncanny X-Force, Wolverine's son Daken forms a new Brotherhood of Evil Mutants with Mystique, Sabretooth, Shadow King, Blob (AoA version), Skinless Man (Weapon III of Weapon Plus) and the Omega Clan (consisting of Omega Red, Omega Black and Omega White who each share the DNA of the original Omega Red) with the apparent goal of exacting revenge on X-Force. The group was seen recruiting Genesis as their next member, in order to turn him into the new Apocalypse.

Mystique's Fourth Brotherhood
Mystique has since gathered a new Brotherhood which consists of herself, Sabretooth, Blob, Silver Samurai II, and Lady Mastermind. By using Lady Mastermind's illusions, they commit numerous heists to incriminate the original X-Men, who had recently been brought through time to the present by Beast.

With the money the Brotherhood of Mutants robbed in the heists, Mystique acquired Madripoor from HYDRA and attempted to turn it into a mutant sanctuary. Posing as Dazzler, Mystique attracted Magneto to the island and showed him her plans. However, Magneto reacted violently to the plan, believing that Mystique and the others were traitors to their species in part due to allowing the use of Mutant Growth Hormone to run rampant in the streets to fund their operations. He heavily injured Mystique and the Brotherhood and left after making their base collapse.

Lady Deathstrike's Sisterhood
Inspired by Madelyne's attempt of defeating the X-Men, Lady Deathstrike has recruited the likes of Typhoid Mary and Enchantress and put together an all new Sisterhood, her own illuminati to take down the X-Men, as well as helping each one of them to achieve their individual goals. They have recently added the newly resurrected Selene to their ranks with the aid of the sentient virus, Arkea, and intend to bring back Madelyne Pryor herself as well. After Lady Deathstrike's host, Ana Cortes had a change of heart about being a supervillain and serving Arkea, she contacted the X-Men and informed them of the Sisterhood's location. She committed suicide. Arkea placed Lady Deathstrike's consciousness in the same body Arkea used for a host, Reiko. Arkea then took the Jean Grey genetic material she purchased and modified Ana Cortes corpse so that it could host Madelyne Pryor. Amora completed the resurrection of Madelyne Pryor. The X-Men assaulted the Sisterhood's hideout. They cut the hideout off the grid. The X-Men assaulted the Sisterhood. As most members of the Sisterhood did not particularly care for Arkea, they did not defend her to the fullest of their capabilities. Karima killed Arkea with a bullet specifically designed to destroy hive mind bacteria. As Arkea Prime was the queen bee of Arkea, once she was killed all Arkea bacteria everywhere died. As Madelyne and Selene left, Madelyne informed the group of her plan to create a new Sisterhood. Lady Deathstrike survived the destruction of Arkea.

Mesmero's Brotherhood
Following the war with the Inhumans and the destruction of the remaining Terrigen cloud, a new group claiming to be the new Brotherhood of Evil Mutants appears, consisting of a new Avalanche, a new Pyro, Masque, Magma and a new reptile-looking member named Kologoth. They are led by a somehow-repowered Mesmero and secretly funded by an anti-mutant activist named Lydia Nance. It was also discovered by the X-Men that Mesmero had used his powers to brainwash the members of his Brotherhood to join the team and force them to carry out those attacks. Once his control was broken, the Brotherhood was dissolved and Mesmero was arrested.

Mesmero eventually escape from the Box and persuades Pyro and Avalanche to help him get revenge on Lydia Nance. After the fight with the X-Men and the NYPD, the Brotherhood of Mutants retreated to their hideout where Mesmero revealed that they were still under Lydia Nance's paycheck and she was the one who facilitated their escape from the Box and that she still has plans for the Brotherhood of Mutants. While Pyro walked away upon not wanting to work for an anti-mutant activist, Avalanche remained with Mesmero and asked for Pyro's cut as well.

Magneto's Second Brotherhood
When Magneto time-traveled 20 years into the future to escape an attack, he found a city in ruins and statues of himself all around. He was greeted by mutants who saw him as a savior. He was also greeted by the time-displaced X-Men, who say Magneto is beyond redemption and that they should have stopped him when they had the chance. When Magneto returns to his own time, he decides it's time to stop pretending. He knows who he is, what he is, and he feels that being that person, that monster, is necessary for mutants to survive. His trip to the future assured him of that. Donning his classic red and purple costume, he steps onto his restored base, New Asteroid M, and calls upon his new Brotherhood of Mutants which consists of Briar Raleigh, Toad, Exodus, Unuscione, Marrow, and Elixir.

This new Brotherhood was short-lived though, as Magneto was soon afterwards captured and turned into a Horseman of Salvation, Elixir and Marrow were seen on Earth and members of Emma Frost's new Hellfire Club, while Exodus had established a new team of Acolytes, with Unuscione as one of its members.

Joseph's Second Brotherhood
Taking the opportunity of Magneto disappearance, Joseph disguised himself as Magneto and appears to disband the former Brotherhood, only to sway Avalanche, Juggernaut, Pyro, Random and Toad to form a new Brotherhood in the wake of the death of the X-Men. The Brotherhood went to an Air Force base in East Transia to put the fear in humans, but were confronted by a new group of X-Men led by a resurrected Cyclops. After the battle, Joseph's identity is revealed as the Master of Magnetism was kidnapped by Nate Grey and mind-controlled to become one of his Horsemen of Salvation.

Known members

Other versions

Age of Apocalypse
In the Age of Apocalypse reality, Apocalypse is served by a strikeforce of mutant fanatics calling itself the Brotherhood of Chaos. Its members are Copycat, Box, Spyne, Yeti and Arclight.

Amazing Spider-Man: Renew Your Vows
In Amazing Spider-Man: Renew Your Vows, the Brotherhood of Mutants consists of Magneto, Blob, Toad, Mist Mistress, Jubilee, and an unnamed mutant that resembles Crucible. They appear to attack the X-Mansion at the time when Spider-Man and his family are visiting. Spider-Man and his family join the fight against the Brotherhood of Mutants who are also shown to have Emma Frost in their group. Magneto wanted Emma Frost to operate Cerebro for the group. With help from Spider-Man's family, the X-Men defeats the Brotherhood of Mutants who are remanded to the Raft.

Battle of the Atom
This version of the Brotherhood appeared in the Battle of the Atom event, first posing as a future X-Men team who wanted to send the past X-Men to their own time. Their true reasons, to prevent the past X-Men from suffering and dying in the future, were revealed, and they were soon at war against the present X-Men, the Uncanny X-Men, and the true Future X-Men. Their members include Xorn (the past Jean Grey, who had to wear a Xorn mask to limit her power), Charles Xavier II (the alleged son of the original Professor X and Mystique), Beast, Ice Thing (a semi-sentient ice construct created by the future Iceman), Molly Hayes, Deadpool, and Raze Logan (the son of Wolverine and Mystique, who first arrived disguised as Shadowcat). Some of the members of the Future Brotherhood died during the event, while some of them survived and remain living in the present.

Although it appeared that all of the Brotherhood members had survived when they infiltrated Cyclops' new school, after the Brotherhood were defeated by the past-Jean Grey's mind powers, it is revealed that Xorn/Jean had been killed in their first appearance in the past, while all of the Brotherhood's other members- except for Raze Logan- were only working with the team due to the telepathic influence of Charles Xavier II. With Xavier II and Raze both subdued, the former Brotherhood were freed and returned to their home future while Charles Xavier II and Raze Logan are left in the present, locked in the prison's Cage.

Marvel 1602
In Neil Gaiman's Marvel 1602 series, Magneto is Enrique, the Grand Inquisitor of the Spanish Inquisition during the year 1602, with Brother Petros and Sister Wanda (Pietro and Wanda Maximoff respectively) serving under him as messenger and assistant, respectively. Enrique had been born a Jew in the ghetto of Venice, but he was taken away from his parents and raised within the Catholic Church. At some point Enrique befriended Carlos Javier, that world's Professor X, who crafted a helmet to protect Enrique from his psychic powers.

After Toad, their spy at the Vatican, betrays the fact that they have been sheltering any 'Witchbreed' (1602 word for Mutants) that can hide their powers, he and his children escape being burnt at the stake, capture Toad, and sail to the Americas; as Gaiman's reinterpretation of Magneto is more rooted in religion than morality, here his group is named 'The Brotherhood of Those Who Will Inherit The Earth'. After a brief encounter with Carlos Javier in which Roberto Trefusis freezes their ship in the middle of the ocean, Enrique agrees to work with the other heroes. When the world is saved, Enrique departs, entrusting Wanda and Petros to Javier, and instructing him to take care of them until he returns, and never to tell them that they are his children. The fate of Toad in this world is unknown, but Enrique had promised to punish him for his betrayal, a punishment which was ultimately left unseen.

Marvel Noir
In the reality of Marvel Noir, this Brotherhood, led by Chief Detective Eric Magnus, is a cabal of corrupt and violent policemen, doing the bidding of Sebastian Shaw. It is formed by Magnus, Dukes, Toynbee, and Wyngarde.

MC2
In Amazing Spider-Girl #22, a Sisterhood of Mutants is featured. This group consists of Magneta, Impact (a superstrong mutant able to increase the size of any part of her body), Pirouette (who can rotate at high speeds), and Headcase (a powerful psychic).

House of M
In the alternate reality depicted in the 2005 House of M storyline, the Brotherhood was created as an NYPD strikeforce team to take down organized crime. Members included John Proudstar (leader), Frank Castle (only human member who left due to seeing how the Brotherhood are mistreating the human criminals), Blob, Feral, Taskmaster, Avalanche, Boom Boom and Misty Knight (who had secretly infiltrated the "Avengers", and would later defect from the Brotherhood).

Ultimate Marvel
In Ultimate X-Men, the Brotherhood of Evil Mutants is called the Brotherhood of Mutant Supremacy, headed by a far more violent and genocidal version of Magneto. It was originally formed by Professor X and Magneto in a plan to create a safe haven for mutants in a city within the Savage Land, but Magneto had other plans to make the mutants more dominant over the humans. The original Brotherhood first seen consisted of Blob, Mastermind, Magneto's twins Quicksilver and Scarlet Witch; Toad, and Wolverine. Soon after their first appearance, Wolverine was planted in the X-Men as a mole and later defected to the X-Men. Cyclops once sided with the Brotherhood during Wolverine's infiltration only to turn against the Brotherhood and assist the X-Men into fighting the Brotherhood of Mutants. When Magneto was seemingly killed by Professor X, Quicksilver and Scarlet Witch tried to use the Brotherhood in more useful ways of gaining mutant rights such as proceeding with talks to the UN. This caused many splinter groups (such as the Acolytes) to split off and attempt to continue Magneto's genocidal techniques. During this short-lived less violent phase, several mutant animal recruits rescued from laboratories were added (one of which was the mutated ape Prosimian), but Magneto rejected them upon his return seeing them as lower species like Homo sapiens and wiped out the mutant animals.

In the Ultimate War and "Return of the King" storylines, Quicksilver and Scarlet Witch defected to the Ultimates to help stop the resurfaced Magneto. Unus, Detonator, Juggernaut, Longshot, Hard-Drive, Rogue, Sabretooth, Vanisher, Forge and Multiple Man join the Brotherhood. After being defeated by the X-Men, the Brotherhood receded for a time. Mystique and Forge free Magneto from his plastic prison cell in the Triskelion, with Mystique taking his place to prevent anyone from realizing that Magneto is free.

In The Ultimates 3, Magneto leads Sabertooth, Blob, Unus, Multiple Man, Mystique, Pyro, Mastermind, and Lorelei in a fight against the Ultimates after the death of his daughter Scarlet Witch at the hands of Ultron. The battle results in the seeming death of Quicksilver as well (though he is later revealed to be alive), Unus being killed by Thor, and Mastermind being killed by Valkyrie who also dismembered Pyro's hands.

Magneto, Blob, Detonator, Forge, Hard-Drive, Longshot, Lorelei, and Multiple Man are killed during the Ultimatum storyline, during which Magneto tries to destroy the human race with Thor's hammer before being killed by Cyclops. Quicksilver turned up alive and was the one who shot Cyclops as he meets up with Mystique and Sabretooth.

Quicksilver later reforms the Brotherhood of Mutants with Mystique, Sabretooth, Blob II, and a somehow-revived Scarlet Witch.

Weapon X: Days of Future Now
In the alternate future of the 2005 miniseries Weapon X: Days of Future Now, Malcolm Colcord convinced people to hate mutants. In issue 4, most of the surviving mutants gather to see the return of Magneto. One of the groups is the Brotherhood led by Sabretooth and consisting of Avalanche, Blob, Caliban, Hub, Mimic, and Scalphunter.

X-Men: Fairy Tales
In the Marvel Fairy Tales continuity, the Brotherhood of Evil Mutants appears as a group of Oni who have captured the Emperor's daughter (Jean Grey). Hitome/Cyclops subdues them. The team members used for this issue were Magneto, Quicksilver, Scarlet Witch, and Toad.

X-Men: No More Humans
Raze assembled a Brotherhood of Mutants with mutants from various alternate universes. All members were previously members of the Brotherhood of Mutants in the main universe: Pyro, Avalanche, Blob, Phantazia, Mastermind, Unus the Untouchable, Lorelei, Vanisher, Toad, Fatale, Peepers, Quicksilver, and Scarlet Witch. The X-Men eventually defeated Raze and his Brotherhood, and sent each of the members back to their home worlds.

In other media

Television
 The Brotherhood of Evil Mutants appear in the Spider-Man and His Amazing Friends episode "The Prison Plot", consisting of Magneto, Toad, the Blob, and Mastermind.
 The Brotherhood of Mutants, referred to as the "Brotherhood of Mutant Terrorists", appear in X-Men: Pryde of the X-Men, consisting of Magneto, Toad, the Blob, Pyro, the Juggernaut, and the White Queen.
 The Brotherhood of Evil Mutants appear in X-Men: The Animated Series, led by Mystique and consisting of the Blob, Avalanche, and Pyro. This version of the group is initially financed by Apocalypse, though only Mystique knows of this.
 The Brotherhood of Mutants, referred to as the "Brotherhood of Bayville", appear in X-Men: Evolution, consisting of teenage versions of Avalanche, Toad, the Blob, and Quicksilver, who are brought together by Mystique on Magneto's behalf. Additionally, Rogue and Boom-Boom appear as temporary members until the former defects to the X-Men and Mystique ousts the latter. In the second season, Magneto's daughter Scarlet Witch joins the group. Due to Mystique's shifting loyalties and Magneto's long periods of absence however, the Brotherhood's male members are often left without guidance. As the series progresses, they slowly grow indifferent to being supervillains, to the point where they stay home whenever possible. In the episode "No Good Deed", Bayville's citizens begin to see the Brotherhood as heroes after they rescue people from a subway disaster, though the male members attempt to capitalize on the rewards they received for their deeds. Towards the end of the series, they become an unpredictable third party in the battle between the X-Men and Magneto's Acolytes, often joining forces with the former despite being rivals. In the two-part series finale "Ascension", Scarlet Witch defects to the X-Men. While on a mission with them, the other Brotherhood members come to rescue their comrade and defeat an Apocalypse-controlled Magneto. In a flash-forward, the Brotherhood and Scarlet Witch go on to join S.H.I.E.L.D.
 The Brotherhood of Mutants appear in Wolverine and the X-Men, led by Quicksilver and consisting of Avalanche, the Blob, Domino, Toad, and Rogue, the last of whom is secretly working undercover as a double agent for the X-Men. This version of the group perform missions for Magneto and Genosha. In the episode "Time Bomb", the Brotherhood are briefly joined by Psylocke, whom they brought in to control Nitro's powers.

Film
The Brotherhood appear in the X-Men film franchise.
 First appearing in the film, X-Men (2000), the group initially consists of Magneto, Mystique, Toad, and Sabretooth. They invent a machine that can trigger mutations in human beings for Magneto's plot to replace the human race with mutants. However, their plans are foiled by the X-Men after the latter discovers the machine destroys the subject's DNA, with Toad and Sabretooth being killed in the ensuing fight.
 In the second installment X2 (2003), Magneto and Mystique are joined by former Xavier Institute student Pyro.
 In the third installment, X-Men: The Last Stand (2006), the Brotherhood recruit a legion of mutants into their ranks, including Phoenix, mutant prisoners Juggernaut and Multiple Man, and the Omegas Quill, Callisto, Arclight, Psylocke, Spike, Glob Herman, and Phat. Together, they oppose the creation of a "mutant cure", though many of them are either subjected to it or fall in battle against various enemies.
 In Dark Phoenix, a young Magneto forms the Brotherhood in the 1990s to avenge Mystique's death, recruiting Selene Gallio and Ariki. The Brotherhood hunt Mystique's killer, Jean Grey, though they and the X-Men end up captured by the U.S. government. While en route to a containment facility, the D'Bari attack, and Gaillo and Ariki are killed in the ensuing battle.

Video games
 The Brotherhood appear in X-Men: Mutant Academy, consisting of Magneto, Mystique, Toad, and Sabretooth.
 The Brotherhood appear in X-Men: Mutant Academy 2, retaining the same members as the previous installment, with the addition of the Juggernaut.
 The Brotherhood appear in X-Men: Next Dimension, consisting of Magneto, Mystique, Toad, Sabretooth, the Juggernaut, the Blob, and Lady Deathstrike.
 The Brotherhood of Mutants appear in the X-Men Legends games, initially consisting of Magneto, Mystique, Toad, the Blob, Pyro, Avalanche, Sabretooth, and Havok along with a substantial number of unnamed Brotherhood grunts.
 In the first game, the Brotherhood is based on Asteroid M and initially led by Mystique until Magneto is rescued from jail. His plan to blockade the Earth with asteroids is thwarted by the X-Men, though the Brotherhood escape while Havok defects to the X-Men.
 In X-Men Legends II: Rise of Apocalypse, the Brotherhood have relocated to Genosha and added the Juggernaut, Scarlet Witch, and Quicksilver to their ranks.
 The Brotherhood of Mutants appear in X-Men: Destiny, consisting of Magneto, Mystique, the Juggernaut, Pyro, Quicksilver, and Toad.
 The Brotherhood of Mutants appear in Marvel: Avengers Alliance, consisting of Magneto, Avalanche, the Blob, the Juggernaut, Mystique, Sabretooth, and Toad along with artificial mutants and modified Sentinels.
 The Brotherhood of Mutants appear in Lego Marvel Super Heroes, consisting of Magneto, Mystique, Sabretooth, Toad, Pyro, the Blob, Mastermind, and the Juggernaut.
 The Brotherhood of Mutants appear in Marvel Strike Force, consisting of Magneto, Mystique, Sabretooth, Pyro, and the Juggernaut.
 The Brotherhood of Mutants appear in Marvel Ultimate Alliance 3: The Black Order, consisting of Magneto, the Juggernaut, and Mystique. The Brotherhood is hired by the Hellfire Club to steal back the Power Stone from the heroes. Even in spite of Sentinels attacking the X-Mansion upon their arrival, the Brotherhood briefly steal the Infinity Stone before they forced to work with the heroes to protect all six stones from Thanos and a new threat discovered by Mister Fantastic and Doctor Doom.

References

External links
 
 

Villains in animated television series
Comics characters introduced in 1964
Comic book terrorist organizations
Marvel Comics mutants
Marvel Comics supervillain teams
Characters created by Stan Lee
Characters created by Jack Kirby
X-Men supporting characters
Fictional revolutionary organizations